Paul of Caen was a Norman Benedictine monk who became fourteenth Abbot of St Albans Abbey in 1077, a position he held to 1093. He was a nephew of Archbishop Lanfranc.

Paul, former monk of the Saint-Étienne abbey in Caen, was an energetic builder at the Abbey, having materials from the ruins of Roman Verulamium, collected by earlier abbots Ealdred and Ealmer, to work with. He also took a firm line with older reverences, disregarding some Anglo-Saxon relics and tombs, and allowing the incorporation of older religious stonework into foundations, thus paradoxically ensuring their preservation for archaeology. He encouraged the transcription of manuscripts.

Notes

Caen
Caen
11th-century Roman Catholic priests
Burials at St Albans Cathedral